Platymitra is a genus of flowering plants belonging to the family Annonaceae.

Its native range is Thailand to Western and Central Malesia.

Species:

Platymitra arborea 
Platymitra macrocarpa

References

Annonaceae
Annonaceae genera